Aconitum napellus, monkshood, aconite, Venus' chariot or wolfsbane, is a species of highly toxic flowering plants in the genus Aconitum of the family Ranunculaceae, native and endemic to western and central Europe.
The leaves are rounded,  diameter, palmately divided into five to seven deeply lobed segments.
Plants native to Asia and North America formerly listed as A. napellus are now regarded as separate species. The plant is extremely poisonous in both ingestion and body contact'.

CultivationAconitum napellus is grown in gardens in temperate zones for its spiky inflorescences that are showy in mid-autumn, and its attractive foliage. There are white and rose colored forms in cultivation too. 
The cultivar 'Spark's Variety' has gained the Royal Horticultural Society's Award of Garden Merit.

Subspecies
Nine subspecies are accepted by the Flora Europaea:Aconitum napellus subsp. napellus, south-western BritainAconitum napellus subsp. corsicum (Gáyer) W.Seitz, CorsicaAconitum napellus subsp. firmum (Rchb.) Gáyer, Central and eastern EuropeAconitum napellus subsp. fissurae (Nyár.) W.Seitz, Balkans to south-western RussiaAconitum napellus subsp. hians (Rchb.) Gáyer, Central EuropeAconitum napellus subsp. lusitanicum Rouy, south-western EuropeAconitum napellus subsp. superbum (Fritsch) W.Seitz, western BalkansAconitum napellus subsp. tauricum (Wulfen) Gáyer, Eastern Alps, southern Carpathians (declared as an own species Aconitum tauricum by other sourcesJäger et al.: Rothmaler - Exkursionsflora von Deutschland, Bd. 2. Ed. 20, Spektrum akadem. Verlag.)Aconitum napellus subsp. vulgare (DC.) Rouy & Foucaud, Alps, Pyrenees, northern Spain

UsesAconitum napellus is grown in gardens for its attractive spike-like inflorescences and showy blue flowers.  It is a cut flower crop used for fresh cutting material and sometimes used as dried material. The species has a low natural propagation rate under cultivation and is propagated by seed or by removing offsets that are generated each year from the rootstocks.  The use of micropropagation protocols has been studied. This species has been crossed with other Aconitums to produce attractive hybrids for garden use, including Aconitum × cammarum.  

Like other species in the genus, A. napellus contains several poisonous compounds, including enough cardiac poison that it was used on spears and arrows for hunting and battle in ancient times. Persian physician Avicenna (980–1037) wrote that arrows dipped in the sap were used to kill, and Dr Antonio Guaineri, in one of the first medical dictionaries 'Practica', wrote that arrows that had the poison from roots of the plant were used to kill wild goats in Italy. A. napellus has a long history of use as a poison, with cases going back thousands of years. During the ancient Roman period of European history, the plant was often used to eliminate criminals and enemies, and by the end of the period it was banned and anyone growing A. napellus'' could have been legally sentenced to death. Aconites have been used more recently in murder plots; they contain the chemical alkaloids aconitine, mesaconitine, hypaconitine and jesaconitine, which are highly toxic. It was also used in a recent Sherlock Holmes book plot.

Toxicology
Marked symptoms may appear almost immediately, usually not later than one hour, and "with large doses, death is almost instantaneous". Death usually occurs within two to six hours in fatal poisoning (20 to 40 mL of tincture may prove fatal). The initial signs are gastrointestinal including nausea, vomiting, and diarrhea. This is followed by a sensation of burning, tingling, and numbness in the mouth and face, and of burning in the abdomen. In severe poisonings pronounced motor weakness occurs and cutaneous sensations of tingling and numbness spread to the limbs. Cardiovascular features include hypotension, sinus bradycardia, and ventricular arrhythmias. Other features may include sweating, dizziness, difficulty in breathing, headache, and confusion. The main causes of death are ventricular arrhythmias and asystole, paralysis of the heart or of the respiratory center. The only post-mortem signs are those of asphyxia.

Treatment of poisoning is mainly supportive. All patients require close monitoring of blood pressure and cardiac rhythm. Gastrointestinal decontamination with activated charcoal can be used if given within one hour of ingestion. The major physiological antidote is atropine, which is used to treat bradycardia. Other drugs used for ventricular arrhythmia include lidocaine, amiodarone, bretylium, flecainide, procainamide, and mexiletine. Cardiopulmonary bypass is used if symptoms are refractory to treatment with these drugs. Successful use of charcoal hemoperfusion has been claimed in patients with severe aconite poisoning.

Poisoning may also occur following picking the leaves without wearing gloves; the aconitine toxin is absorbed easily through the skin. In this event, there will be no gastrointestinal effects. Tingling will start at the point of absorption and extend up the arm to the shoulder, after which the heart will start to be affected. The tingling will be followed by unpleasant numbness. Treatment is similar to poisoning caused by oral ingestion and even handling the plant without gloves has been reported to result in multi-organ failure and death.

The plant's chief toxic component, aconitine, is a potent neurotoxin that opens tetrodotoxin sensitive sodium channels. It increases the influx of sodium through these channels and delays repolarization, thus increasing excitability and promoting ventricular dysrhythmias.

References

External links

napellus
Flora of the Alps
Flora of Europe
Plants described in 1753
Taxa named by Carl Linnaeus
Poisonous plants